The 2022 Louisiana–Monroe Warhawks football team represented the University of Louisiana at Monroe as a member of the West Division of the Sun Belt Conference during the 2022 NCAA Division I FBS football season. Led by second-year head coach Terry Bowden, the Warhawks compiled an overall record of 4–8 with a mark of 3–5 in conference play, placing fifth in the Sun Belt's West Division. Louisiana–Monroe played their home games at Malone Stadium in Monroe, Louisiana.

Preseason

Recruiting class

Sun Belt coaches poll
The Sun Belt coaches poll was released on July 25, 2022. The Warhawks were picked to finish last in the West Division.

Sun Belt Preseason All-Conference teams

Offense

2nd team
Boogie knight – Wide Receiver, GS

Special teams

2nd team
Calum sutherland – Kicker, 6th YR

Schedule
Louisiana-Monroe has announced the dates for all non-conference games. All conference games were announced in early March 2022.

Game summaries

at Texas

Sources:Stats

Nicholls

at No. 2 Alabama

Sources:

Louisiana

at Arkansas State

Coastal Carolina

at South Alabama

at Army

Texas State

at Georgia State

at Troy

Southern Miss

References

Louisiana–Monroe
Louisiana–Monroe Warhawks football seasons
Louisiana–Monroe Warhawks football